Muzaffarnagar Medical College (MMC) in Muzaffarnagar, Western Uttar Pradesh, India. It provides low cost health care to the surrounding rural areas of Muzaffarnagar district, Saharanpur district & other nearby areas.

Location
Muzaffarnagar Medical College is located on the Delhi-Dehradun highway approximately 120 km from Delhi, about 10 km on the outskirts of the sugar-belt city of Muzaffarnagar near the Begrajpur Industrial Area.  
The Address of Muzaffarnagar Medical College & Hospital is Muzaffarnagar Medical College, Opp.Begrajpur Industrial Area, 115 km Stone, Delhi-Dehradun Road, Muzaffarnagar, Uttar Pradesh

History

Muzaffarnagar Medical College was established in 2006 by the Fateh Chand Charitable Trust under the chairmanship of Late Sh. Satish C. Goel. The college is approved by the Medical Council of India, a division of the Ministry of Health and Family Welfare of the Government of India. The medical college was affiliated with Chaudhary Charan Singh University at Meerut from 2006-2021; since 2021, the college has been affiliated with Atal Bihari Vajpayee Medical University.

Academics

The Institute is currently offering various courses:
 M.B.B.S. (Annual intake of 165 students)
 M.D./Master of Surgery in various disciplines (36 permitted seats and 34 Recognized seats) 
 G.N.M.
 Diploma in Physiotherapy
 Diploma in Optometry
 Diploma in O.T. Technician.

Muzaffarnagar Medical College Hospital

Muzaffarnagar Medical College Hospital (MMCH), spread over an area of 25 acres is an MCI recognized 950 bedded tertiary care and research centre and has various departments for facilities of IPD & OPD (Department of Medicine, Surgery, Obstetrics & Gynaecology, Pediatrics, Dermatology & STD, TB and Chest, Psychiatric, Orthopedic, ENT, Ophthalmology, Dentistry, Radio Diagnosis, Ultrasonology, Anesthesiology, Department of Pathology, Microbiology & Biochemistry) with some super specialty branches as well like Cardiology & Nephrology. The hospital has facility of Dialysis, CT Scan, MRI & DSA - Interventional Radiology headed by Prof Sunil Kumar Agarwal Prof & HoD, Radiodiagnosis. It also has a 24-hour Blood Bank & Pharmacy for the patient's urgent needs. The Medical college has been ranked 12th in all the medical colleges of Uttar Pradesh

The attached medical college has all non-clinical and para-clinical departments including Anatomy, Physiology, Pharmacology, Forensic Medicine, Community Medicine , and a central library and Medical Education Unit for medical students.

The hospital recently started the facilities of Dialysis, IVF and Cath lab

During the COVID-19 pandemic in India in 2020, the medical college has been designated as level 1 and level 2 Quarantine and treatment center for the Muzaffarnagar district.

Activities

The Institution published a biannual Journal Journal of Advance Researches in Biological Sciences (JARBS) under Dr. Shashank Tyagi (editor) from 2008 to 2015.

The Institution is also publishing an Annual College Magazine Campus Chronicle)

The College organizes its annual Socio-cultural event by the name "Insomnia" in the month of November–December and had its first Alumni Meet on 2–3 March 2019. The college also maintains a list of all its alumni and encourages interaction among them through the specialized portal https://alumni.mmcollege.org/

References

External links 
Muzaffarnagar Medical College Website
Medical Council of India Website

Medical colleges in Uttar Pradesh
Medical Council of India
Muzaffarnagar
Educational institutions established in 2006
2006 establishments in Uttar Pradesh